The Nuclear Regulatory Commission has divided the US territory into four regions:

Tasks 
These four regions oversee the operation of 104 power-producing reactors, and 36 non-power-producing reactors.  This oversight is done on several levels, for example:

Each power-producing reactor site has Resident Inspectors, who monitor day-to-day operations
Numerous special inspection teams, with many different specialties, routinely conduct inspections at each site
Whistleblower reports are investigated by the Office of Enforcement, specifically the Allegations branch

Region I
Headquartered in King of Prussia, Pennsylvania, Region I oversees 15 plants in the north-eastern United States.

Connecticut
 Millstone Nuclear Power Plant in Waterford

Maryland
 Calvert Cliffs Nuclear Power Plant in Lusby

Massachusetts
 Pilgrim Nuclear Generating Station in Manomet

New Hampshire
 Seabrook Station Nuclear Power Plant in Seabrook

New Jersey
 Hope Creek Nuclear Generating Station in Lower Alloways Creek Township
 Oyster Creek Nuclear Generating Station in Forked River
 Salem Nuclear Power Plant in Lower Alloways Creek Township

New York
 Ginna Nuclear Generating Station in Ontario
 Nine Mile Point Nuclear Generating Station in Scriba
James A. FitzPatrick Nuclear Power Plant in Scriba

Pennsylvania
 Beaver Valley Nuclear Generating Station near Shippingport
 Limerick Nuclear Power Plant in Limerick Township, Montgomery County
 Peach Bottom Nuclear Generating Station in Peach Bottom Township, York County
 Susquehanna Steam Electric Station in Salem Township
 Three Mile Island Nuclear Generating Station near Harrisburg

Region II

Headquartered in Atlanta, Georgia, Region II oversees 18 plants in the south-eastern United States.

Alabama
 Bellefonte Nuclear Generating Station in Hollywood
 Browns Ferry Nuclear Power Plant near Decatur and Athens
 Joseph M. Farley Nuclear Generating Station near Dothan

Florida
 St. Lucie Nuclear Power Plant near Ft. Pierce
 Turkey Point Nuclear Generating Station near Homestead

Georgia
 Edwin I. Hatch Nuclear Power Plant near Baxley
 Vogtle Electric Generating Plant near Augusta and Waynesboro

North Carolina
 Brunswick Nuclear Generating Station near Southport
 McGuire Nuclear Station near Charlotte
 Shearon Harris Nuclear Power Plant in New Hill

South Carolina
 Catawba Nuclear Station near York
 Oconee Nuclear Station in Seneca
 H. B. Robinson Nuclear Generating Station near Hartsville
 Virgil C. Summer Nuclear Generating Station near Winnsboro

Tennessee
 Sequoyah Nuclear Generating Station near Soddy-Daisy
 Watts Bar Nuclear Generating Station near Spring City

Virginia
 North Anna Nuclear Generating Station near Louisa
 Surry Nuclear Power Plant near Surry

Region III

Headquartered in Lisle, Illinois, Region III oversees 15 plants in the northern mid-western United States.

Illinois
 Braidwood Nuclear Generating Station in Will County
 Byron Nuclear Generating Station near Byron
 Clinton Nuclear Generating Station near Clinton
 Dresden Nuclear Power Plant in Morris
 LaSalle County Nuclear Generating Station near Ottawa
 Quad Cities Nuclear Generating Station near Cordova

Iowa
 Duane Arnold Energy Center near Palo

Michigan
 Donald C. Cook Nuclear Generating Station in Bridgman
 Enrico Fermi Nuclear Generating Station near Monroe
 Palisades Nuclear Generating Station near South Haven

Minnesota
 Monticello Nuclear Generating Plant near Monticello
 Prairie Island Nuclear Power Plant in Red Wing

Ohio
 Davis-Besse Nuclear Power Station near Oak Harbor
 Perry Nuclear Generating Station in North Perry

Wisconsin
 Point Beach Nuclear Generating Station near Two Rivers

Region IV
Headquartered in Arlington, Texas, Region IV oversees 12 plants in the southern midwestern and the western United States.

Arizona
 Palo Verde Nuclear Generating Station in Wintersburg

Arkansas
 Arkansas Nuclear One in Russellville

California
 Diablo Canyon Power Plant in Avila Beach
 San Onofre Nuclear Generating Station in San Diego County (in process of becoming decommissioned)

Kansas
 Wolf Creek Nuclear Generating Station in Burlington

Louisiana
 River Bend Nuclear Generating Station in St. Francisville
 Waterford Nuclear Generating Station near Hahnville

Mississippi
 Grand Gulf Nuclear Generating Station near Port Gibson

Missouri
 Callaway Nuclear Generating Station near Fulton

Nebraska
 Cooper Nuclear Station near Brownville

Texas
 Comanche Peak Nuclear Generating Station near Glen Rose
 South Texas Nuclear Generating Station near Bay City

Washington
 Columbia Generating Station near Richland

Former regions 
The NRC previously had five regions. Region V was headquartered in Walnut Creek, California and was responsible for activities in the seven far-west states: Alaska, Arizona, California, Hawaii, Nevada, Oregon and Washington. The NRC decided in September 1993 to consolidate Regions IV and V into a single Region headquartered in Arlington, Texas. On April 4, 1994, NRC Region V was abolished, and the NRC Region IV office in Arlington, Texas was given expanded responsibilities to include the seven states formerly governed by Region V. The former NRC Region V office in Walnut Creek remained open as the redesignated Walnut Creek Field Office, supporting resident inspection activities at power plants in the Pacific states of Washington, Oregon and California until October 1, 1998, when the Walnut Creek Field Office was abolished to further reduce costs.

References